Leylah Annie Fernandez was the defending champion, but chose to compete in the women's singles competition instead. She lost to seventh seed Petra Kvitová in the third round.

Third seed Elsa Jacquemot was awarded a wild card into the main competition, but lost to qualifier Renata Zarazúa in the first round. Jacquemot then entered the Girls' Singles competition and won the title, defeating Alina Charaeva in the final, 4–6, 6–4, 6–2.

Seeds

Draw

Finals

Top half

Section 1

Section 2

Bottom half

Section 3

Section 4

References

External links 
Draw at rolandgarros.com
Draw at ITFtennis.com

Girls' Singles
2020